Juan José Fuenmayor Núñez (born 5 September 1979) is a Venezuelan professional football player who currently plays for Miami United FC in the National Premier Soccer League. He can play as a left-back or central defender.

Club career
Fuenmayor started his playing career with Unión Atlético Maracaibo where he was part of the squad that won  Primera División Venezolana in 2005.  After financial troubles hit, he joined Maracaibo based Zulia FC before a brief spell in Europe with Vålerenga.  He returned to Venezuela, signing for Deportivo Anzoátegui in 2010.

International career
He made his debut for Venezuela in 2005 and has made 25 appearances, scoring no goals

External links

 

1979 births
Living people
Sportspeople from Maracaibo
Venezuelan footballers
Venezuela international footballers
Association football defenders
UA Maracaibo players
Zulia F.C. players
Vålerenga Fotball players
Deportivo Anzoátegui players
Venezuelan expatriate footballers
Expatriate footballers in Norway
Eliteserien players
Venezuelan expatriate sportspeople in Norway